The 2011 FIBA Europe Under-16 Championship for Women Division C was the 7th edition of the Division C of the FIBA U16 Women's European Championship, the third tier of the European women's under-16 basketball championship. It was played in Andorra la Vella, Andorra, from 25 to 30 July 2011. Andorra women's national under-16 basketball team won the tournament.

Participating teams

First round

Group A

Group B

Playoffs

Final standings

References

2011
2011–12 in European women's basketball
FIBA U16
Sports competitions in Andorra la Vella
FIBA